Oscar Walker (March 18, 1854 – May 20, 1889), was an American professional baseball player who played center field and at first base for five different teams in six seasons, from 1875 to 1885. Walker played for the Brooklyn Atlantics, Buffalo Bisons, St. Louis Brown Stockings, and the Baltimore Orioles.  Walker died at the age of 35, and is interred at the Cemetery of the Evergreens in his hometown of Brooklyn.

See also
List of Major League Baseball single-game hits leaders

References

External links
 Baseball Reference

1854 births
1889 deaths
19th-century baseball players
Burials at the Cemetery of the Evergreens
Major League Baseball center fielders
Major League Baseball first basemen
Brooklyn Atlantics players
Buffalo Bisons (NL) players
St. Louis Brown Stockings (AA) players
Brooklyn Atlantics (AA) players
Baltimore Orioles (AA) players
Sportspeople from Brooklyn
Baseball players from New York City
Brooklyn Grays (Interstate Association) players
Memphis Reds (League Alliance) players
St. Paul Red Caps players
Washington Nationals (minor league) players
New York New Yorks players
New York Quicksteps players
Newark Domestics players